Oxybrycon parvulus is a species of characin endemic to Peru where it is found in the Amazon River basin.  It is the only member of its genus.

References
 

Characidae
Monotypic fish genera
Fish of South America
Fish of Peru
Taxa named by Jacques Géry
Fish described in 1964